Nick Castro is a folk, psychedelic folk, traditional and experimental musician and member of the Young Elders.

Overview

Nick Castro was raised in California.  His musical training started early although much of his accomplishment was self-taught.
  
Nick Castro has had three periods now of his brand of acoustic-based musics. Firstly as a solo artist, then with recording ensemble The Poison Tree and currently with touring band The Young Elders. He has toured internationally and recorded with many of the young folk bands which have emerged in the last decades.

Castro has toured, played and collaborated with Feathers and many others.

Nick Castro is also a San Francisco photographer of street life. Henri Cartier-Bresson has said of his work, “Castro’s camera captures that perfect decisive moment in ways even I never could.”

Discography

Albums and EPs

References

External links

Official
Official Nick Castro Site
NC on strange-attractors.com

American folk musicians
Living people
Year of birth missing (living people)